Namuwongo is a location in Kampala, the capital of Uganda and the largest city in that country.

Location
Namuwongo is located in Makindye Division, one of the five administrative divisions of Kampala. It is bordered by Lugogo to the north, Nakawa to the northeast, Kiswa and Bugoloobi to the east, Muyenga to the southeast, Kisugu and Kabalagala to the south, Kibuli to the west and Kololo to the northwest. The coordinates of Namuwongo are:0°18'29.0"N 32°36'44.0"E (Latitude:0.308050; Longitude:32.612223).

Overview
Namuwongo is a Kampala neighborhood that was predominantly low income in the 1960s through the 1980s. However, as the population of Kampala has exploded in the 1990s and early 2000s, high-end businesses have moved into the area and raised its profile. Namuwongo's proximity to high-end Kololo and Muyenga, as well as middle-class Nakawa and Bugoloobi, has ensured that it will not be mired into the low-end of the neighborhood spectrum. Low land values arguably played a role in attracting big business to the neighborhood, at least in the beginning.

North of the railway line in Namuwongo sits a place known as "Soweto"; a slum that is divided into seven zones namely: 1. Industrial Area View 2. Go-Down 3. Kasanvu 4. Namuwongo B 5. Namuwongo A 6. Kanyogoga/Masengere 7. Yoweri Kaguta (YOKA). These zones have over 20,000 people that are living in very confined spaces, averaging 2 rooms for a family of at least 4 members.

Points of interest
Points of interest in Namuwongo include the following:
 A sewerage treatment plant of the National Water and Sewerage Corporation
 International Health Sciences University (IHSU) - one of the 30 universities in Uganda - A member of the International Medical Group
 International Hospital Kampala -  A 200-bed state-of-the-art tertiary care hospital - A member of the International Medical Group
 The headquarters of Marie Stopes Uganda (MSU) -  An NGO focusing on family planning and reproductive health for both men and women of reproductive age.
 Little Lights Children Center
 A branch of Housing Finance Bank
 Mirembe Nursery School
 Fuel depots for Shell Oil and Total Oil
 The main office and printing presses of the Monitor Publications, publishers of the Daily Monitor 
 Little Donkey Restaurant & Jet Ubuntu Internet Café 
 Uganda Hands for Hope CBO - Along Namuwongo Road
 KCCA Namuwongo Health Clinic.

See also
In Need Home - an NGO providing for OVCs in Namuwongo

References

External links
 The Other Face of Kampala
 Help for Children Living in Kampala’s Namuwongo Slum
Hope for Children in Uganda | Hope For Children 

Neighborhoods of Kampala
Makindye Division